The Premios 40 Principales for Best Latin Artist was an honor presented annually at Los Premios 40 Principales, a ceremony that recognizes excellence in music, organised by Spain's top music radio Los 40 Principales. The award was first seen in 2007, separated from the Best International Artist category, and was replaced by the LOS40 Urban Award in 2019, but brought back the next year as part of an expansion of the Latin category.

Shakira is the most awarded artist in this category, being a four-time winner. Juanes follows her with two awards. In 2013, Ricky Martin became the first non-Colombian artist to notch the award.

Category facts

Most Wins in Category

Most Nominations

References

2011 music awards